Desert Financial Arena (formerly ASU Activity Center and Wells Fargo Arena) is a 14,198-seat multi-purpose arena located at 600 E Veterans Way in Tempe, Arizona, a suburb of Phoenix. It sits immediately east of Sun Devil Stadium on the northern edge of the Tempe campus of Arizona State University (ASU).

Constructed in the spring of 1974 as the ASU Activity Center and at the cost of $8 million, it is the home of men's basketball, women's basketball, and women's volleyball and former home of women's gymnastics and men's wrestling. The facility also plays host to graduation ceremonies and a variety of concerts and shows. The building replaced Sun Devil Gym as the primary arena for the Sun Devils' basketball team.

The former naming rights for the arena were purchased by Wells Fargo & Co. in 1997. The current naming rights to arena were purchased by Desert Financial Credit Union in 2019 for $1.5 million for 5 years.

Design
The structure contains offices and locker rooms for men's basketball, women's basketball, women's volleyball, and the men's and women's track and field team, along with a weight room, coaches and film rooms, and an equipment room.

Events

Led Zeppelin played their third-to-last show as part of their 1977 North American Tour.

During the 1979 NBA Playoffs, the Phoenix Suns defeated the Kansas City Kings in a game which was moved from the Arizona Veterans Memorial Coliseum due to a scheduling conflict.

Bruce Springsteen & the E Street Band performed at the arena on November 5, 1980 during the River Tour. Video and audio of the show were released in 2015 in conjunction with the band's The Ties That Bind commemorative box set, and their performance of "Badlands" was included on 1986's Live 1975–85 album.

The arena hosted the first dates of U2's Joshua Tree Tour in March 1987, with the tour eventually concluding next door at Sun Devil Stadium in December of that year.

It hosted the 1990 Pacific-10 Conference men's basketball tournament.  Previously, the Sun Devils played at Sun Devil Gym.

The arena has also hosted the 1st and 2nd rounds of the NCAA Women's Basketball Tournament in both 2015 and 2016.

See also
 List of NCAA Division I basketball arenas

References

External links

 Desert Financial Arena on the ASU virtual tour

College basketball venues in the United States
College gymnastics venues in the United States
College volleyball venues in the United States
College wrestling venues in the United States
Arizona State Sun Devils men's basketball
Arizona State Sun Devils women's basketball
Arizona State Sun Devils women's volleyball
Arizona State Sun Devils wrestling
Arizona State University buildings
Basketball venues in Arizona
Sports venues in Tempe, Arizona
1974 establishments in Arizona
Sports venues completed in 1974
Arizona State Sun Devils